Regent's International School, Bangkok is a day and boarding school for students aged 2 – 18. The school is guided by the English National Curriculum from the Early Years Foundation Stage (EYFS) leading to IGCSE (International General Certificate of Secondary Education) and IB (International Baccalaureate) Diploma Programme in the Sixth Form.

The school has partnered with Premier League Football Academy and Yamaha Music School to provide students with training in football and music.

Facilities
The school campus includes three buildings, an artificial turf playing field, swimming pool, basketball court, tennis court, a sports complex, a theatre, safe play area, libraries, well-equipped science labs, Yamaha music room, and gym.

Teachers and students
Of the students currently enrolled, there are over 35 nationalities represented. The majority of teachers and boarding staff are British. There are also Irish, Australian, New Zealand, Canadian and American staff. All are first language English speakers except for Thai, Mandarin, Spanish and French language teachers and all teaching staff have UK accredited Qualified Teacher Status.

Memberships and accreditation
Regent's International School Bangkok joined the Round Square Association in 2001. The curriculum is derived in part from the membership of Round Square and the ideals of internationalism, democracy, environmental, adventure, leadership, and service.

The school is a member of Federation of British International Schools in Asia (FOBISIA), Council of International Schools, and British Boarding School Association. The school is accredited internationally by CIS, and nationally by ONESQA.

Scholarships
 Bhutanese Scholarship
 UN Sponsored Awards
 Music Scholarship
 Global Connect Scholarship
 Olympiad Scholarship
 British Boarding Scholarship Programme
 Diplomatic Connect Programme

Fees and tuition
Prior to matriculation, non-refundable fees of 155,500 baht are payable. Tuition fees range from 370,530 – 678,420 baht per year depending on the child's age. Boarding fees range from 89,400 – 103,900 baht per year.

Gallery

References

External links

 Official website

Cambridge schools in Thailand
Regent's School
Regent's School Thailand
Boarding schools in Thailand
Private schools in Thailand
1995 establishments in Thailand